Raoul II of Brienne (1315 – 19 November 1350) was the son of Raoul I of Brienne, Count of Eu and Guînes and Jeanne de Mello. He succeeded his father in 1344 as Count of Eu and Guînes, as well as in his post as Constable of France.

In 1340, he married Catherine (d. 1388), the daughter of Louis II, Baron de Vaud. They had no children; one illegitimate son, Jean du Bois, Lord of la Maison Forte, was legitimized as Raoul's in 1395, although his actual genealogy is disputed. He was second cousin to Enguerrand VII.

In 1346, he was captured at Caen during the battle by Thomas Holland, 1st Earl of Kent and kept prisoner. In 1350, he was allowed to return to France to attempt to raise money for his ransom. Upon his arrival, he was seized and summarily executed by decapitation without any due process under orders of John II of France, for reasons that remain unclear, although it was rumoured that he had pledged Thomas his castle and the County of Guînes for his release.

Notes

References

Sources

 

|-

Counts of Eu
Counts of Guînes
1350 deaths
Executed French people
People executed by the Ancien Régime in France
House of Brienne
14th-century executions by France
Constables of France
Year of birth unknown
People of the Hundred Years' War
French prisoners of war in the Hundred Years' War
1315 births